Arturo Beristain (born September 5, 1949) is a retired Mexican professional wrestler, or Luchador in Spanish, who works as a wrestling trainer at the Mexican professional wrestling promotion Consejo Mundial de Lucha Libre's (CMLL) gym in Mexico City, Mexico. Beristain is best known for working under two different ring names, Talismán and El Hijo del Gladiador; both personas started out as enmascarados, or masked, and Beristain lost both masks in Luchas de Apuestas. He lost the Talismán mask to Atlantis in 1984 and the Hijo del Gladiador mask to Rencor Latino in 2000. As Talismán, Beristain won the Mexican National Welterweight Championship twice, the Mexican National Middleweight Championship and the Mexican National Lightweight Championship. As el Hijo del Gladiador he has won the CMLL World Trios Championship with Gran Markus, Jr. and Dr. Wagner Jr. and the IWRG Intercontinental Middleweight Championship. When Beristain lost the "Hijo del Gladiador" he was announced as "Arturo Beristain Ramírez" to further the storyline that he was actually the son of wrestler "El Gladiador", but his last name is not actually Ramírez.

Professional wrestling career
Beristain made his professional wrestling debut in 1971 at the age of 21, wrestling under the ring name Santiago Ayala. A few years later Beristain adopted an enmascarado (masked) ring persona by the name of Talismán. The change to the Talismán character was so successful that Beristain began working for Empresa Mexicana de Lucha Libre (EMLL), Mexico's largest wrestling promotion. On August 30, 1978, Talismán defeated Mario Valenzuela to win the Mexican National Lightweight Championship, his first professional wrestling championship. He held the title for 221 days before losing the title to Rodolfo Ruiz on April 8, 1979. It would be almost two years before Talismán won another title, defeating El Supremo for the Mexican National Welterweight Championship on March 30, 1982.

Talismán successfully defended the title several times, including a rematch with the deposed champion, until losing it on November 12, 1982, to Mocho Cota. In 1984 Talismán entered and won a tournament for the vacant Mexican National Welterweight Championship, defeating Américo Rocca in the finals. On September 21, 1984, Talismán lost a Luchas de Apuesta, bet match, to Atlantis and was forced to unmask after the match and reveal his real name per lucha libre traditions. Talismán held the Welterweight title for 222 days before Rocca finally managed to defeat Talismán. On March 2, 1986, Talismán gained a measure of revenge on Atlantis by defeating him for the Mexican National Middleweight Championship. He successfully defended the title for 273 days before losing it to Mogur on November 30, 1986.

In the late 1980s Beristain switched ring characters, becoming an enmascarado once more, using the name El Hijo del Gladiador (Spanish for "The Son of the Gladiator"), using a storyline blood relation to deceased wrestler El Gladiador. Hijo del Gladiador began teaming with Dr. Wagner, Jr. and Gran Markus, Jr. to form the group La Ola Blanca, a group that continued the tradition started by Dr. Wagner, Jr's father Dr. Wagner and Ángel Blanco in the 1960s and 1970s. On April 22, 1994, La Ola Blanca defeated Los Brazos (El Brazo, Brazo de Oro and Brazo de Plata) to win the CMLL World Trios Championship (EMLL had been renamed Consejo Mundial de Lucha Libre in 1990). The trio held the title for almost a year, 343 days in total, before losing the Trios title to Bestia Salvaje, Emilio Charles, Jr. and Sangre Chicana on March 31, 1995. On August 6, 1996, Hijo del Gladiador and Gran Markus, Jr. teamed up to defeat Atlantis and Rayo de Jalisco, Jr. to win the CMLL World Tag Team Championship. The team only held the title for 43 days before losing it to Atlantis and Lizmark on September 18, 1996.

After the loss of the tag team title La Ola Blanca broke up with each wrestler going their separate ways. Due to the CMLL/International Wrestling Revolution Group (IWRG) talent-exchange agreement Hijo del Gladiador began working for IWRG in late 1997, and in early 1998 he defeated El Pantera to win the IWRG Intercontinental Middleweight Championship. He defended it a couple of times in the following 186 days before losing the title to Magnum Tokyo on July 5, 1998. On August 4, 2000, El Hijo del Gladiador was one of the participants in a Torneo cibernetico, where the last man eliminated would be forced to unmask. On that night he was bested by Rencor Latino and forced to unmask as a consequence of his loss. Beristain announced that his full name was "Arturo Beristain Ramírez" to keep up the storyline that he really was the son of El Gladiador. It was later confirmed that his last name was not Ramirez. Arturo Beristain retired from wrestling in 2005 and became a full-time wrestling trainer for CMLL in their wrestling school in Mexico City, where he still works, training several of CMLL's rookie wrestlers.

Championships and accomplishments
Consejo Mundial de Lucha Libre
CMLL World Tag Team Championship (1 time) – with Gran Markus, Jr.
CMLL World Trios Championship (1 time) – with Gran Markus, Jr. and Dr. Wagner Jr.
Mexican National Lightweight Championship (1 time)
Mexican National Middleweight Championship (1 time)
Mexican National Welterweight Championship (2 times)
International Wrestling Revolution Group
IWRG Intercontinental Middleweight Championship (1 time)

Luchas de Apuestas record

Notes

References

1949 births
Living people
Mexican male professional wrestlers
Professional wrestling trainers
Professional wrestlers from Mexico City
Mexican National Middleweight Champions
CMLL World Tag Team Champions
20th-century professional wrestlers
21st-century professional wrestlers
CMLL World Trios Champions
Mexican National Welterweight Champions